The 1821 Massachusetts gubernatorial election was held on April 2, 1821.

Incumbent Federalist Governor John Brooks won re-election to a sixth term, defeating Democratic-Republican nominee William Eustis.

General election

Candidates
John Brooks, Federalist, incumbent Governor
William Eustis, Democratic-Republican, incumbent U.S. Representative, former Secretary of War

Results

References

1821
Massachusetts
Gubernatorial